is a Japanese manga series written by Hiroshi Noda and illustrated by Takahiro Wakamatsu. It has been serialized on Shogakukan's Yawaraka Spirits website since October 2019. An anime television series adaptation has been announced.

Media

Manga
Written by Hiroshi Noda and illustrated by Takahiro Wakamatsu, No Longer Allowed In Another World started on Shogakukan's Yawaraka Spirits website on October 2, 2019. Shogakukan has collected its chapters into individual tankōbon volumes. The first volume was released on April 10, 2020. As of November 10, 2022, eight volumes have been released.

The manga is licensed in North America by Seven Seas Entertainment. The first volume was released in January 2023.

Volume list

Anime
An anime television series adaptation was announced on July 11, 2022.

Reception
In 2020, the manga was one of the nominees for the 6th Next Manga Awards in the Web Manga category.

See also
No Longer Human
Ningyohime no Gomen ne Gohan, another manga series by the same creators
Love After World Domination, another manga series by the same creators

References

Further reading

External links
 

2019 webcomic debuts
Anime series based on manga
Dark comedy anime and manga
Isekai anime and manga
Japanese webcomics
Seinen manga
Seven Seas Entertainment titles
Shogakukan manga
Upcoming anime television series
Webcomics in print